Trey Moore (born April 6, 1975 in Houston, Texas), is a retired American professional basketball player. Moore is a 6 ft 4 in shooting guard, who played for Shreveport-Bossier Mavericks of the American Basketball Association.

Early years 
Moore attended Paris Junior College from 1994 to 1996, representing the Basketball team in the 1994–1995 and 1995–1996 seasons.  He was coached by Scott Schumacher.
  
Moore then transferred to Mississippi State University in Starkville, Mississippi, where he played for the Bulldogs in the 1996–97 and 1997–98 seasons. In total, Moore played 59 times for Mississippi State, averaging 9.7 Points Per Game, 2.7 Rebounds Per Game and 3.3 Assists Per Game.

Professional career 

Moore began his professional career in the 1999–2000 International Basketball Association for Black Hills Gold.  He currently plays for the Newcastle Eagles in the British Basketball League.  Moore is currently in his second spell with the Newcastle Eagles, returning at the start of the 2010–2011 season, with Managing Director Paul Blake commenting, "I would personally rate him as one of the best players to don an Eagles shirt".

Black Hills Gold 

1999–2000

Moore began his professional career in the 1999–2000 International Basketball Association for Black Hills Gold.  Black Hills Gold finished runners up in the West Division and lost out in the IBA Division Semi Finals to Magic City Snowbears.

La Marque Mustangs 

2002–2003

After taking some time out to play for the Harlem Globetrotters Moore signed for La Marque Mustangs for the 2002–2003 XBL season.

Birmingham Bullets 

2003–2004

In the 2003–04 season Moore made his debut in the British Basketball League, for the Birmingham Bullets.  His debut game came on December 7, 2003 against Milton Keynes Lions.  The official British Basketball League website shows that Moore made 25 appearances for Birmingham Bullets and had a 24.28 Points Per Game Average, a 5.24 Rebounds Per Game Average and a 5.08 Assists Per Game Average.

Chester Jets 

2004–2005

Before the start of the 2004–05 season Moore signed for British Basketball League side Chester Jets.  The official British Basketball League website shows that Moore made 40 appearances for Chester Jets and had a 22.83 Points Per Game Average, a 4.3 Rebounds Per Game Average and a 5.25 Assists Per Game Average.  This was a successful season and Moore picked up a British Basketball League Championship and a runner up medal in the British Basketball League Play-Offs.  On a personal level Moore picked up the British Basketball League Most Valuable Player (MVP) award.

2007–2008

In the 2007–08 season Moore returned to the British Basketball League and to the Chester Jets.  He made 13 appearances and had a 19.92 Points Per Game Average, a 5.62 Rebounds Per Game Average and a 3.85 Assists Per Game Average.

Newcastle Eagles 

2008–2009

In the 2008–09 season Moore signed for the Newcastle Eagles and made 33 appearances with averages of 19.73 Points Per Game, 5.09 Rebounds Per Game and 4.55 Assists Per Game.  In this season Moore picked up a British Basketball League Championship, a British Basketball League Play-Off Winner's medal and a BBL Trophy Winner's medal.  On a personal level Moore picked up his second British Basketball League MVP award.  He is only the third person to achieve two MVP awards in the British Basketball League.

Everton Tigers 

2009–2010
In the 2009–10 season Moore signed for Everton Tigers and made 19 appearances with averages of 20 Points Per Game, 3.74 Rebounds Per Game and 4.55 Assists Per Game.  Moore won the British Basketball League Play-Offs in this season.

Newcastle Eagles 

2010–2011
On August 26, 2010 it was confirmed that Moore had re-signed for Newcastle Eagles.
In the 2010–11 season after 9 appearances Moore had averaged 23.33 Points Per Game, 6.44 Rebounds Per Game and 6.22 Assists Per Game.

Honours and awards 

 2 BBL MVP Awards (2004/2005 and 2008/2009)
 2-Time British Basketball League Championship Winner (2004/2005 and 2008/2009)
 2-Time British Basketball League Play-Off Winner (2008/2009 and 2009/2010)
 1-Time British Basketball League Play-Off Runner Up (2004/2005)
 1-Time British Basketball Trophy Winner (2008/2009)

Harlem Globetrotters 

In 2001 Moore had a break from the professional game and played for the Harlem Globetrotters.

References

1975 births
Living people
American expatriate basketball people in the United Kingdom
Cheshire Jets players
Harlem Globetrotters players
Paris Dragons basketball players
Mississippi State Bulldogs men's basketball players
Newcastle Eagles players
American men's basketball players
Shooting guards